Turgut   is a town in Muğla Province, Turkey.

Geography 
Turgut  is in Yatağan district of Muğla Province. The population of the town is  2,065 as of 2010.

History 
The ruins of the ancient cult city  Lagina is around Turgut and the alternative name of the town Leyne may be a corrupt form of Lagina. The town also houses an old mosque which is claimed to be built by İlyas Bey of Menteşe Beylik in 1311. Another building of historical importance is the mansion of Osman Hamdi Bey who stayed in Turgut between 1891-1893 during Lagina excavations.
His house underwent a major restoration and refurbishment work and opened to public as a Museum.

Archaeology 
Recent studies have shown that the site had been inhabited and/or employed in an uninterrupted manner during a time span stretching back to the Bronze Age. Seleucid kings conducted a considerable reconstruction effort in the sacred ground of Lagina and transformed it into a foremost religious center of its time, with the nearby (at a distance of 11 kilometers) site of Stratonicea becoming the administrative center. The two sites (Lagina and Stratoniceakeia) were connected to each other in antiquity by a holy path.
The archaeological research conducted in Lagina is historically significant in that it was the first to have been done by a Turkish scientific team, under the direction of Osman Hamdi Bey and Halit Ethem Bey. In 1993, excavation and restoration work was resumed under the guidance of Muğla Museum, by an international team advised by Professor Ahmet Tırpan.

The friezes of the Hecate sanctuary are displayed in the Istanbul Archaeology Museums. Some of the archaeological finds unearthed are on display in Mugla Museum.

Economy 
Main economic activity of the town is agriculture. Cereals and olive are the most important crops. There are some olive oil factories. There is a lignite mine around the town . The lignite is used in Yatağan Thermal Power Plant.

References

Populated places in Muğla Province
Towns in Turkey
Yatağan District